The 1987 NCAA Division I Field Hockey Championship was the seventh women's collegiate field hockey tournament organized by the National Collegiate Athletic Association, to determine the top college field hockey team in the United States. The Maryland Terrapins won their first championship, defeating the North Carolina Tar Heels in the final. The championship rounds were held at Navy Field in Chapel Hill, North Carolina.

Bracket

References 

1987
Field Hockey
1987 in women's field hockey
1987 in sports in North Carolina
Women's sports in North Carolina